The Agricultural and Labour Party was a Greek political party. It was founded in 1926 by Alexandros Papanastasiou, a former member of the Liberal Party.

In the 1928 Greek legislative election, the party gained 6.7%, elected 20 MPs and participated in the government of the Liberals.
In the 1929 Greek Senate election, the party gained 6.6% and elected 4 MPs. In the 1932 Greek legislative election, the party lost most of his power and gained 5.9% and elected 8 MPs. In the 1933 Greek legislative election, gained 4.2% and elected 13 MPs. 
Finally, in the 1936 Greek legislative election, the party participated in the Democratic Coalition, a coalition of centre-left parties and elected 7 MPs. After the death of its leader, Alexandros Papanastasiou, the party was dissolved.

Social democratic parties in Greece
Defunct socialist parties in Greece
History of Greece (1924–1941)
Alexandros Papanastasiou
1926 establishments in Greece
Political parties established in 1926
Labour parties